Armando de Sales Oliveira (24 December 1887 – 17 May 1945) was a Brazilian politician. He was born and died in São Paulo.

References

External links
 Galeria dos Governadores de São Paulo
 Referência em página do Governo de Pernambuco

1887 births
1945 deaths
Governors of São Paulo (state)

dono do valorant